Midway may refer to the following places in the U.S. state of Iowa:

Midway, Floyd County, Iowa, an unincorporated community
Midway, Johnson County, Iowa, a ghost town
Midway, Linn County, Iowa, an unincorporated community
Midway, Woodbury County, Iowa, an unincorporated community
Midway Beach, Iowa, an unincorporated community